Roldano Lupi (8 February 1909 – 13 August 1989) was an Italian film actor. He appeared in 60 films between 1942 and 1967. He was born in Milan, Italy and died in Rome, Italy.

Selected filmography

 Jealousy (1942)
 Yes, Madam (1942)
 Farewell Love! (1943)
 The Priest's Hat (1944)
 The Za-Bum Circus (1944)
 The Gates of Heaven (1945)
 The Ten Commandments (1945)
 The Testimony (1946)
 The Adulteress (1946)
 Flesh Will Surrender (1947)
 The White Devil (1947)
 Cab Number 13 (1948)
 Prelude to Madness (1948)
 Sicilian Uprising (1949)
 Altura (1949)
 The Angel of Sin (1952)
 Wolves Hunt at Night (1952)
 Koenigsmark (1953)
 Frine, Courtesan of Orient (1953)
 House of Ricordi (1954)
 The Contessa's Secret (1954)
 Crossed Swords (1954)
 The Affair of the Poisons (1955)
 The Courier of Moncenisio (1956)
 The Mongols (1961)
 Avenger of the Seven Seas  (1962)
 Kali Yug: Goddess of Vengeance (1963)
 Revenge of The Gladiators (1964)

References

External links

1909 births
1989 deaths
Italian male film actors
20th-century Italian male actors